Mouzam Makkar is an Indian-born American actress.

Early life and education 
Makkar was born in Kerala, India, and raised in the United Arab Emirates. She moved to the United States when she was twelve. She graduated from the University of Illinois at Urbana–Champaign in three years with First Class Honors and a Bachelor of Science in Finance.

Career 
Makkar was a regular cast member in the ABC series The Fix and the NBC series Champions. She also had recurring roles in the TV series The Vampire Diaries, The Exorcist, and Easy Abby. In 2015, she played the role of Mrs. Negani in the thriller film Consumed, directed by Daryl Wein.

Makker played video game developer Raina Punjabi on Law & Order: Special Victims Unit in the episode "Intimidation Game", which aired on February 11, 2015. She returned for three episodes in 2018 and 2020 as defense lawyer Dara Miglani.

Makker played Jennifer McDuffie, adoptive mother of the titular character, on Naomi.

References

External links 
 

Actresses from Kerala
American actresses of Indian descent
American film actresses
American television actresses
Year of birth missing (living people)
Indian emigrants to the United States
Indian film actresses
Indian television actresses
Living people
Gies College of Business alumni
21st-century American actresses
21st-century Indian actresses